Bonneville is a subprefecture of the Haute-Savoie department in the Auvergne-Rhône-Alpes region in Eastern France. In 2018, the commune had a population of 12,557.

Geography
Bonneville is on the A40 autoroute, roughly halfway between Geneva and Chamonix.  The urban centre is on the north bank of the Arve river, with urban development reaching to the foot of the mountains to both the north and south.

Bonneville sits at the juncture between the Swiss Voralpen and the French Prealps.  to the west, the Arve valley is a wide and fertile outwash plain, while to the east, it is a classical glacial valley.

Transport 
The commune has a railway station, on the La Roche-sur-Foron–Saint-Gervais-les-Bains-Le Fayet line.

Population

Twin towns — sister cities
Bonneville is twinned with:

  Staufen im Breisgau, Germany (1963)
  Racconigi, Italy (1989)

See also
Communes of the Haute-Savoie department

References

External links
  Official site

Communes of Haute-Savoie
Subprefectures in France